Pal Pal Dil Ke Ssaat is a 2009 Hindi-language film directed by V.K.Kumar, starring Ajay Jadeja, Vinod Kambli, Mahi Gill, Satish Shah and Sushma Seth.

Cast
Ajay Jadeja as Ajay Kapoor
Mahie Gill as Dolly
Vinod Kambli as Himself
Satish Shah as John Abraham
Sushma Seth as Mrs. Kapoor
Vivek Mishra as Paniker
Anshul Nagar as Vinit Khanna
Tanvir Azmi as Makhan Singh

References

External links
 
 

2009 films
2000s Hindi-language films